Blaine Myron Higgs  (born March 1, 1954) is a Canadian politician who is the 34th and current premier of New Brunswick since 2018 and leader of the New Brunswick Progressive Conservative Party (PC Party) since 2016.

Higgs graduated from the University of New Brunswick as an engineer. He then worked for 33 years for Irving Oil. Higgs ran for the leadership of the anti-bilingual New Brunswick Confederation of Regions Party in 1989. Higgs was first elected to the legislature in the 2010 provincial election and served as minister of finance from 2010 to 2014 in the government of David Alward. In the 2018 provincial election, Higgs narrowly carried the PCs to a minority government, despite losing the popular vote. Higgs and the PCs were re-elected in the 2020 provincial election, though this time with a majority government.

Life and career

Higgs was born in Woodstock, New Brunswick, and graduated from the University of New Brunswick as an engineer. He worked for 33 years for Irving Oil, rising to the position of senior executive overseeing oil transportation across eastern Canada and New England. Higgs retired from Irving Oil in 2010.

Early political career
Higgs has belonged to three political parties and ran for the leadership of two.

Liberal Party
Before joining the Confederation of Regions party, Higgs was a Liberal party member but left the Liberals because he opposed Canadian bilingualism and the New Brunswick Official Languages Act.

Confederation of Regions Party
In his mid-thirties, Higgs ran for the leadership of the New Brunswick Confederation of Regions (COR) party, stating that he was in favour of "common-sense". In his bid for the COR leadership, Higgs "complained about francophones 'who can speak the common language, but refuse to'". He also supported an elected Senate, opposed the Meech Lake Accord, favoured fixed terms for government, and stated "We do not have an obligation to cater to those people who can speak the common language, English, and refuse to do so".

Finance minister
On October 12, 2010, Higgs was sworn-in as Minister of Finance, Minister responsible for the New Brunswick Liquor Corporation, Minister responsible for the New Brunswick Investment Management Corporation, Minister responsible for the New Brunswick Lotteries and Gaming Corporation, and Chair of the Board of Management. He also served as Minister of Human Resources until October 9, 2012. While Higgs was Minister of Finance, the decision was made to stop making regular payments to pension plans, later causing pension issues for Canadian Union of Public Employees (CUPE) members leading to the strike in 2021.

Progressive Conservative Party leadership
Higgs represents the electoral district of Quispamsis as a member, and, since October 22, 2016, leader of the Progressive Conservative Party of New Brunswick. On that date the Progressive Conservative Party of New Brunswick leadership election was held and on the third ballot he defeated former Saint John Mayor Mel Norton, 1,563 to 1,169.

2018 provincial election

In the 2018 provincial election, Higgs and his party won the largest share of seats in the legislature, 22, compared to 21 for the governing Liberal Party of New Brunswick, which opted to attempt to remain in power as a minority government by presenting a Throne Speech in hopes of retaining the confidence of the Legislative Assembly of New Brunswick.

On November 2, 2018, the Progressive Conservatives and the People's Alliance combined to defeat Premier Brian Gallant's Liberal minority government via a non confidence vote in the legislature.

Premier of New Brunswick (2018–present)

Higgs was appointed Premier on November 9, 2018. At 64 years of age at the time of swearing-in, Higgs is the oldest person to be sworn in as Premier in New Brunswick history, and in April 2019 became the oldest ever Premier in New Brunswick history, surpassing Leonard Percy de Wolfe Tilley in both records.

Economic policy

In 2019, Higgs began repealing several financial assistance programs for New Brunswick students attending post-secondary institutions. His party deemed programs such as the Timely Completion Benefit, established in May 2009, to be "very costly". The Progressive Conservative Party of New Brunswick believed redistributing the funds allocated to this program through a tuition tax credit was a "better" way to reach more students. This move, along with the removal of the Free Tuition Program, were highly criticized by students across the province, with some emphasizing that there is no longer any incentive to remain in New Brunswick to work or study.

In 2020, Higgs opted out of a federal program to fund public transit in New Brunswick, as he "misunderstood details" of the federal program designed to rescue municipal transit services. Higgs claimed multiple times that the funding was for capital projects, but according to a government backgrounder on the agreement, that specific program was meant to address the operating deficits and revenue shortfalls caused by the pandemic. Higgs also claimed that the program was only for larger provinces, stating, "that was a specific request for infrastructure funding for subways and for systems in Toronto and Montreal and BC — for the big cities." Documents later showed that Saskatchewan, Manitoba and Nova Scotia have received a combined $57.1 million from Ottawa's "Safe Restart" public transit aid program. New Brunswick asked for and received $0.

Equalization

Higgs raised the idea of cutting equalization payments made to 'have-not provinces', including New Brunswick during a First Ministers' meeting in Montreal in 2018. The New Brunswick government budgeted for $1.8-billion worth of equalization transfers in 2018-19. Without 30 per cent of the budget coming through federal transfer payments, Higgs suggested attitudes might change about resource development.

Labour

Higgs's government had to deal with the Canadian Union of Public Employees (CUPE) strike in October and November 2021. About 20,000 workers in the education, health, transportation and infrastructure sectors went on strike for 16 days. On November 14, Higgs's government reached a deal with CUPE. The agreement included raising wages for the workers.

Reconcilliation
In 2020, the Higgs government was urged to call an inquiry into systemic racism following police officers shooting and killing Chantel Moore and Rodney Levi in separate incidents that summer. First Nations Chiefs later walked out on a meeting with Higgs following his refusal to commit to an independent inquiry, stating that they were 'losing faith' in him.

The following year, Higgs's government pulled out of tax-sharing agreements with 13 Mi'kmaq and Wolastoqey First Nations without consultation.

Aboriginal Affairs Minister Arlene Dunn announced in 2021 that the Higgs Government would hire an independent commissioner to examine systemic racism rather than call a public inquiry. Indigenous leaders later denounced the provincial government's plan to address systemic racism, calling it a form of systemic racism itself.

Following a major land title claim filed by Wolastoqey Chiefs, Higgs alleged that title claim "impacts every single land owner" in the province by claiming title to "private lands of any kind" with "no limits". Higgs's comments that the lawsuit might lead to Indigenous people winning control of 60 per cent of the province's land, including private homes and businesses was flatly contradicted by the 657-page statement of claims filed by the chiefs in court, which listed only five forestry companies, NB Power, and the federal and provincial governments.

Shortly afterwards, New Brunswick's Attorney General Ted Flemming sent a memo to government employees which asked them to cease making indigenous territorial acknowledgements that made reference to 'unceded' or 'unsurrendered' land. "As a result of this litigation, legal counsel for GNB and the Office of the Attorney General has advised that GNB employees may not make or issue territorial or title acknowledgements. This includes the use of territorial acknowledgements at meetings and events, in documents, and in email signatures." This policy faced growing backlash, including within the Premier's own cabinet. A leaked series of emails revealed Education Minister Dominic Cardy and Transportation Minister Jill Green wrote to the premier complaining that the new policy was causing unnecessary conflict and “creates the impression of a government intentionally reinforcing racist behaviour.”

COVID-19 pandemic

Higgs led the provincial government response to the COVID-19 pandemic in New Brunswick. On March 19, 2020, the government declared a state of emergency. Higgs tested positive for COVID-19 on December 31, 2021.

2020 re-election

Higgs argued that stability in government was required for the next phase of the COVID-19 pandemic and economic recovery. The snap election was called on August 17, 2020. Higgs and the Progressive Conservatives were re-elected to a majority government in the 2020 provincial election held on September 14.

Electoral record

Quispamsis

References

1954 births
Living people
Finance ministers of New Brunswick
Members of the Executive Council of New Brunswick
Leaders of the Progressive Conservative Party of New Brunswick
People from Woodstock, New Brunswick
Progressive Conservative Party of New Brunswick MLAs
21st-century Canadian politicians
Premiers of New Brunswick